Jakub Prüher (born January 2, 1968, in České Budějovice) is a Czechoslovak-Czech slalom canoeist who competed from the mid-1980s to the mid-1990s. He finished 29th in the C1 event at the 1992 Summer Olympics in Barcelona.

World Cup individual podiums

References
 Sports-reference.com profile

1968 births
Canoeists at the 1992 Summer Olympics
Czechoslovak male canoeists
Czech male canoeists
Living people
Olympic canoeists of Czechoslovakia
Sportspeople from České Budějovice